The Peugeot 408 is a crossover car produced by French automaker Peugeot. It was unveiled in June 2022 as a C-segment vehicle slotting between the 308 and 3008 or 508. It is based on the EMP2 platform closely shared with the third-generation 308, and despite sharing the saloon silhouettes, mechanically unrelated to the Chinese market 408 saloon (which itself was based on the previous-generation 308). According to Peugeot, the 408 is a blend between SUVs, hatchbacks and saloons, and has been described as a coupe crossover.

Overview
Development of the vehicle by PSA Group took seven years due to its radical concept, and was led by project manager Aurélie Bresson. The vehicle was codenamed as the P54 during development. The design was inspired from an internal concept car that Peugeot had worked on, which was known as the "2015 Advanced Design manifesto". Its design concept was also featured by the Citroën C5 X, which shares the same platform (long-wheelbase EMP2 V3) and height with the 408. Due to its body shape, the 408 achieves a low coefficient of drag of 0.28, on par with traditional saloons. The 408 also shared the same headlights, taillights, and dashboard design as the third-generation 308, which was developed alongside it.

All models are mated to an 8-speed automatic gearbox. The petrol engine will be replaced with a mild hybrid unit in late 2023 and a battery electric model called the e-408 will follow.

The 408 is produced in Mulhouse, France since 2022 and Chengdu, China since January 2023. In the Chinese market, the model is sold as the 408 X to differentiate it with the older saloon model.

The dichroic paintwork of the 2017  concept inspired that of the 408.

408 First Edition
Peugeot's UK division launched a limited edition of 50 units named First Edition, based on the GT trim.

Powertrain
The 408 is only available with an automatic gearbox, with no manual options.

Outside Europe, the 408 is also offered with a  THP petrol engine.

A battery electric version has been officially announced for 2023 or 2024.

References

External links

 

408
Cars introduced in 2022
Compact sport utility vehicles
Crossover sport utility vehicles
Hatchbacks
Euro NCAP small family cars
Front-wheel-drive vehicles
Hybrid sport utility vehicles
Plug-in hybrid vehicles
Partial zero-emissions vehicles